Cissus striata (Chilean Spanish: parrilla) is a climbing plant of the family Vitaceae. The plant is found in south-central Chile with a distribution range from Coquimbo to Los Lagos Region. It is also found in Argentina, Brazil, Uruguay, Paraguay and Bolivia. It has a woody stem that looks reddish when it gets older. Its leaves are composed by five folioles in a palmated shape.

References

Cissus striata in Chilebosque
Chilean climbers handbook
Florachilena.cl

Flora of Argentina
Flora of Brazil
Flora of Chile
striata